The Young Conservatives (MK CZ) is a right-wing political youth organisation in the Czech Republic.  It is the youth wing of the Civic Democratic Party (ODS), a centre-right political party, and shares that party's conservative and economically liberal ideology.

Young people within the age from 15 to 35 apply for a membership in the MK. Several significant politicians from the ODS party started as members of Young Conservatives, including Jan Zahradil, Jiří Pospíšil, Petr Sokol, Martin Baxa, Petr Gandalovič, Ivan Langer, Martin Novotný, and Pavel Drobil. Former Chairman of Young Conservatives Petr Mach went on to found a new right-wing political party, the Party of Free Citizens.  Current Chairman of Young Conservatives is David Vančík, who is in the office since 2019.

History
The founding congress was held on 8 December 1991 as a result of previous preparations through Charter of Young Conservatives by a group of students at the University of Technology in Brno and Law Students' Association "Všehrd" from Faculty of Law at the Charles University. First Chairman of the Young Conservatives we elected David Částek.

Ideology
Original ideological course of the Young Conservatives was given by the Charter of Young Conservatives following basic conservative principles: Democracy, Nationhood, Rule of Law, Liberty, Free Market, Tradition, Private Ownership, Family and Morality. Through its history Young Conservatives were closely cooperating with the Civic Democratic Party (ODS). Organization defines its approach towards the European Union as Eurorealistic or Euroskeptic.

Activities
The Young Conservatives organize wide range of events from meetings with local or national politicians to elections campaigns and international events. The most significant events since 1991 are listed below:

Campaign in the Republic of Ireland for an Irish 'no' vote in the 2002 referendum on the Treaty of Nice.

Chairmen
Below are listed as follows Chairmen of the Young Conservatives.

International Affiliation

European Young Conservatives

European Democrat Students

International Young Democrat Union

Democrat Youth Community of Europe

Footnotes

External links
  Young Conservatives Official Website

Politics of the Czech Republic
Youth politics
Youth wings of Alliance of Conservatives and Reformists in Europe member parties
1991 establishments in Czechoslovakia
Youth organizations established in 1991
Youth wings of political parties in the Czech Republic
Civic Democratic Party (Czech Republic)
Youth wings of conservative parties